The women's 10,000 metres at the 2016 European Athletics Championships took place at the Olympic Stadium on 6 July.

Records

Schedule

Results

Final

Source: European-athletics.org

References

External links
 amsterdam2016.org, official championship site.

10000 W
10,000 metres at the European Athletics Championships
2016 in women's athletics